Nikolai Nikolayevich Dobronravov (Russian: Николай Николаевич Добронравов; born 22 November 1928) is a Soviet and Russian poet and lyricist. He collaborates with his wife Aleksandra Pakhmutova.

Awards and honors

 Lenin Komsomol Prize (1978)
 Order of the Badge of Honour (1978)
 USSR State Prize (1982)
 Order of the Red Banner of Labour (1984)
 Order "For Merit to the Fatherland", 3rd class (2003)
 Order "For Merit to the Fatherland", 2nd class (2008)

1928 births
20th-century Russian male writers
20th-century Russian poets
21st-century Russian male writers
21st-century Russian poets
Living people
Writers from Saint Petersburg
Moscow Art Theatre School alumni
Recipients of the Lenin Komsomol Prize
Recipients of the Order "For Merit to the Fatherland", 2nd class
Recipients of the Order "For Merit to the Fatherland", 3rd class
Recipients of the Order of the Red Banner of Labour
Recipients of the USSR State Prize
Socialist realism writers
Russian lyricists
Russian male film actors
Russian male poets
Russian male writers
Russian schoolteachers
Soviet male film actors
Soviet male poets

Soviet schoolteachers